Butterfly Valley Botanical Area, in the northern Sierra Nevada, was designated a protected botanical area in 1976 due to its abundance and diversity of plant life. It is located just north of Quincy, in Plumas County of northeastern California, United States.

Plants
The Butterfly Valley Botanical Area is a home of the rare carnivorous plant, Darlingtonia californica. It grows only in limited and scattered bog habitats — from where the northern Sierra Nevada and southern Cascade Range meet near here, up through northern California to southern Oregon.

The unique plant community also includes other carnivorous plants; a dozen Piperia species of native orchids; two dozen species of native lilies and tiger lilies including Lilium washingtonianum and Lilium parvum; many species of native California ferns; and other California native plants.

History
Mining
The Butterfly Valley Botanical Area consists of Butterfly Valley and the surrounding area.  In the early 1850s, mining operations and the old mining town of Butterfly Valley occupied the area.  When the mines panned out, the town of Butterfly Valley was abandoned.

Grazing
Grazing and logging operations took over, after mining ended.  The Galeppi brothers increased grazing in the area by bringing in their cattle into the area in the early 1900s.  Grazing continued until the Butterfly Valley Botanical Area was designated a protected botanical area in 1976.

At about the same time as grazing began, the Murphy Lumber Company began railroad logging, which was expanded by Quincy Lumber Company, the purchaser of the Murphy Lumber Company. Logging operations stopped in 1950.

See also
List of plants of the Sierra Nevada (U.S.)

References

External links

Plumas National Forest: Butterfly Valley Botanical Area - Visiting activities and information

Nature reserves in California
Plumas National Forest
Natural history of Plumas County, California
Protected areas of the Sierra Nevada (United States)
Protected areas of Plumas County, California
Flora of the Sierra Nevada (United States)
Plant communities of California